The 1976 NCAA Men's Water Polo Championship was the eighth annual NCAA Men's Water Polo Championship to determine the national champion of NCAA men's college water polo. Tournament matches were played at the Belmont Plaza Pool in Long Beach, California during December 1976.

Stanford defeated UCLA in the final, 13–12, to win their first national title.

The leading scorer for the tournament was Dave Breen from Arizona (17 goals). Chris Dorst, from Stanford, was named the Most Outstanding Player. An All-Tournament Team, consisting of seven players, was also named.

Qualification
Since there has only ever been one single national championship for water polo, all NCAA men's water polo programs (whether from Division I, Division II, or Division III) were eligible. A total of 8 teams were invited to contest this championship.

Bracket
Site: Belmont Plaza Pool, Long Beach, California

All-tournament team 
Chris Dorst, Stanford (Most outstanding player)
Rob Arnold, Stanford
Rick Johannsen, Stanford
Drew McDonald, Stanford
Boyd Philpot, UC Irvine
John Stephens, UCLA
Joe Vargas, UCLA

See also 
 NCAA Men's Water Polo Championship

References

NCAA Men's Water Polo Championship
NCAA Men's Water Polo Championship
1976 in sports in California
December 1976 sports events in the United States
1976